Jörg Schmeisser (20 February 1942 – 1 June 2012) was a noted and award-winning printmaker.

Biography
Schmeisser was born in Stolp, Pomerania, Germany (modern Słupsk, Poland); he studied at the Hamburg Fine Art Academy, Germany during 1962–67 and also in Kyoto (Kyoto Fine Art Academy) during 1969-72. During his studies in Hamburg he studied printmaking under Paul Wunderlich. In the 1960s and 1970s, he was also involved in archeological excavations in Israel and Greece as a draughtsman/artist. In the years 1978–97 he worked at the Canberra School of Art, appointed Founding Head of the Department of Printmaking. Schmeisser travelled extensively through Europe, Asia and Australia. He was married to the artist Keiko Amenomori Schmeisser. He died in 2012 in Canberra, Australia

Awards
 Fremantle Print Award: 1980 (joint award with Rod Ewins)

Bibliography

References

External links
 Images of Schmeisser's prints held by the National Gallery of Australia
 Images of Schmeisser's prints held by the Art Gallery of New South Wales

Australian printmakers
German printmakers
German artists
1942 births
2012 deaths
People from Słupsk
People from the Province of Pomerania